Clavillas is one of fifteen parishes (administrative divisions) in Somiedo, a municipality within the province and autonomous community of Asturias, in northern Spain.  

The postal code is 33841.

Villages
 Bustariega (La Bustariega)
 Clavillas (Clavichas)
 Santiago (Santiagu)
 Valcárcel

Parishes in Somiedo